The Zeppelin-Staaken R.XV was an Imperial German bomber of World War I. An incremental improvement to the Zeppelin-Staaken R.VI, this was one of a series of large strategic bombers called Riesenflugzeuge, intended to be less vulnerable than dirigibles in use at the time.

Development
Almost identical to the R.XIV, the R.XV had a lighter airframe and more refined aerodynamics, in an effort to improve performance. Three aircraft were ordered, (R.46 to R.48), all three being completed by 1 September 1918.

As with most Zeppelin Riesenflugzeuge, the R.XV had two engine pods with four engines in a push-pull configuration, large enough for some inflight maintenance. Additional power was provided by a fifth engine mounted in the nose of the aircraft.

Operational history
At least two of the R.XVs built saw action on the Western Front, late in 1918.

Operators

Specifications (Zeppelin-Staaken R.XV)

Notes

References
A. K. Rohrbach, “Das 1000-PS Verkehrsflugzeug der Zeppelin-Werke, Staaken,” Zeitschrift für Flugtechnik und Motorluftschiffahrt, vol. 12, no. 1 (15 January 1921);
E. Offermann, W. G. Noack, and A. R. Weyl, Riesenflugzeuge, in: Handbuch der Flugzeugkunde (Richard Carl Schmidt & Co., 1927).
The German Giants by G.W. Haddow and Peter M. Grosz.

Zeppelin-Staaken
1910s German bomber aircraft
Military aircraft of World War I
Pusher aircraft
Aircraft first flown in 1918